University of Art (Daneshgah-e Honar-e Tehran) is the largest art university in Iran, consisting of seven faculties and an international campus in Tehran and its suburb Karaj. It is composed of five former separate academic institutions: the Conservatory of Music (founded 1918), the College of National Music (founded 1949), the College of Decorative Arts (founded 1960), the College of Dramatic Arts (founded 1964), and Farabi University (founded 1975). The school offers 21 bachelor's majors, 29 master's majors, and five PhD majors. Gholamreza Akrami has been president of the university since 2014.

The university was formerly known as the Art Academic Complex from 1979 until 1991, when it was given its current name.

Faculties

Faculty of Applied Arts
The Ministry of Art and Culture established the Faculty of Decorative Arts in 1960, originally offering programs in printing, painting, pottery, fabrics, and interior architecture. When University of Art was consolidated and established in 1991, the faculty gained its current name. Current offerings include industrial design and clothing design. Dr. Ahmad Tondi is the faculty's dean.

Faculty of Architecture and Urban Planning
Originally founded in 1999 as the department of urbanism, the faculty was expanded in 2000 and is located in both Tehran and Karaj. In addition to BA and MA programs, the Faculty of Architecture offers two PhD programs in urbanism and architecture. The dean of the faculty is Dr. Seyed Behshid Hosseini.

Faculty of Cinema and Theater
In 1957, the Department of Fine Arts established the Dramatic Arts Office, which was renamed to the Faculty of Dramatic Arts in 1960. Since Iranian universities re-opened in 1983, the school has operated as the Faculty of Cinema and Theater, currently offering BA and MA programs in eight areas: cinema, acting, puppetry, scenery design, acting and directing, dramatic literature, animation, and theater directing.

The current dean is Dr. Shahabodin Adel.

Faculty of Conservation and Restoration
This school offers MA and PhD programs in museum studies, Islamic arts, and historical reconstruction and renovation. Dr. Samad Samanian is the dean of the faculty.

Faculty of Music
Now located in Karaj, the Faculty of Music was spun off from the Faculty of Applied Arts and moved out of Tehran in 1994. That original program was formed from the Conservatory of Music and the College of National Music in 1989. The school offers programs in military, Iranian, and classical music performance, as well as composition and ethnomusicology. Dr. Hamid Askari is the school's dean.

Faculty of Theories and Art Studies
The Faculty of Theories and Art Studies offers MA and PhD programs in art studies, art philosophy, and Islamic art history. The dean is Dr. Esmaeel Bani Ardalan.

Faculty of Visual Arts
The Faculty of Visual Arts was founded in 1978, taking over some majors then offered by the Faculty of Decorative Arts and Farabi University, and it expanded in 1983 to include programs in photography and painting. The dean of the school is Dr. Sodabeh Salehi.

Farabi International Campus
Farabi International Campus offers a total of 24 MA and PhD programs. The president of is Dr. Reza Khodadadi.

Notable people

List of presidents

 
 Dr. Mahmud Zarin Ghalam
 Dr. Akbar Haj Ebrahim Zargar (1982–1985)
 Abdolrahim Asgari (1985–1989)
 Dr. Gholamreza Akrami (1989–1995)
 Dr. Akbar Haj Ebrahim Zargar (1995–1998)
 Dr. Mohammad Reza Hafezi (1998–2004)
 Dr. Seyed Hassan Shahrestani (2004–2005)
 Dr. Abbas Ali Eizadi (2005–2010)
 Dr. Saeed Kashan Fallah (2010–2014)
 Dr. Gholamreza Akrami (2014–present)

References

External links 
 University of Art (Tehran) Website
 Uoa Open Education 

1980 establishments in Iran
Educational institutions established in 1980
Tehran University of Art